Vietnamese people in Singapore are about 0.3% of the country's population, with about 15,000 residents at least in presence. The Vietnamese community of Singapore largely includes food and restaurant servicepeople, and school/university students. Initial waves of Vietnamese immigrants and migrants were mainly refugees from South Vietnamese during the early aftermath or end of the Vietnam War.

Demographics
Many of them work in the food and beverage industry such as restaurants and hawker centres, or are in Singapore to study, said the Singaporean-Vietnamese embassy's deputy chief of mission.

Refugee migration 
During the Vietnam War, Singapore became one of the main transit points for Vietnamese refugees, hosting 32,457 Vietnamese refugees from 1978 to 1996 alone. 5,000 settled during the first set of waves throughout the late 1970s. Despite this, the Government of Singapore refused to accept refugees, resulting in a policy code-named Operation Thunderstorm. In 1996, the country's only refugee camp (located in Hawkins Road Sembawang), a former military barracks outpost, was closed by authorities after two decades of running, and the refugees repatriated to Vietnam at the request of the UNHCR.

Prior to significant waves of immigration or refugee migration in the late 1970s, there was an attempt of singular mass migration via plane holding South Vietnamese refugees in 1975. On April 4, a C-130 plane was seized in Vietnam by four South Vietnam Air Force majors, and 52 Vietnamese refugees joined. The plane was discovered in Singapore, the plane was impounded, and its passengers were later arrested.

Religion and services
Vietnamese in Singapore largely include those of Buddhist religions, as well as that of Christian faiths. The Emmanuel Church of Singapore includes a Vietnamese-language worship.

Notable people
Tila Tequila (born Nguyễn Thị Thiên Thanh, or Tila Nguyễn), actress/model, born in Singaporean and grew up in Texas 
Youyi, an actress

See also 

 Singapore–Vietnam relations

References

Singaporean people of Vietnamese descent